Phrynichus was a poet of the Old Attic comedy and a contemporary of Aristophanes. His first comedy was exhibited in 429 BC. He composed ten plays, of which the Recluse was exhibited at the City Dionysia in 414 along with the Birds of Aristophanes and gained the third prize. His Muses carried off the second prize at the Lenaia in 405, Aristophanes being first with the Frogs, in which he accuses Phrynichus of employing vulgar tricks to raise a laugh, of plagiarism and bad versification, and of lowbrow politics.

Surviving titles and fragments

Ephialtes ("Ephialtes")
Konnos
Kronos  ("Cronus")
Komastai ("Revellers")
Monotropos ("The Recluse")
Mousai ("The Muses")
Mystai ("The Initiated Women")
Poastriai ("Ladies Who Weed the Fields")
Satyroi ("The Satyrs")
Tragodoi ("Tragic Actors"), or Apeleutheroi ("Liberated Slaves")

References

Ancient Greek dramatists and playwrights
Old Comic poets
Year of birth unknown
Year of death unknown